Nicolae L. Lupu (November 4, 1876 – December 4, 1946) was a Romanian left-wing politician and social physician. Originally a leader of the Labor Party, which was joined with the Peasants' Party, Lupu served as Interior Minister in 1919–1920. He formed his own Peasants' Party–Lupu in 1927, and also steered the creation of a League Against Usury. His group became a dissident faction of the National Peasants' Party, and was reestablished, after World War II, as the Democratic Peasants' Party–Lupu.

Leaders of political parties in Romania
National Peasants' Party politicians
Peasants' Party (Romania) politicians
20th-century Romanian politicians
Romanian Ministers of Education
Romanian Ministers of Health
Romanian Ministers of Interior
20th-century Romanian physicians
1876 births
1946 deaths